Richard Phillip Egington (born 26 February 1979 in Warrington, Cheshire) is a British rower. He won a silver medal at the 2008 Summer Olympics for Great Britain in the men's eight. He was part of the British squad that topped the medal table at the 2011 World Rowing Championships in Bled, where he won a gold medal as part of the coxless four with Matt Langridge, Tom James and Alex Gregory.

At the 2012 Summer Olympics in London, United Kingdom he was part of the British crew that won the bronze medal in the eight.

References

English male rowers
British male rowers
Rowers at the 2008 Summer Olympics
Rowers at the 2012 Summer Olympics
Olympic rowers of Great Britain
Olympic silver medallists for Great Britain
1979 births
Living people
Sportspeople from Warrington
Olympic medalists in rowing
Olympic bronze medallists for Great Britain
Medalists at the 2012 Summer Olympics
Medalists at the 2008 Summer Olympics
Members of Leander Club
World Rowing Championships medalists for Great Britain